Invasion of Tibet may refer to:

Bakhtiyar Khilji's Tibet campaign (1206)
Mongol invasions of Tibet (13th century)
Dzungar invasion of Tibet (1717)
Chinese expedition to Tibet (1720)
Gurkha invasions of Tibet (1788 and 1791)
Sikh invasion of Tibet (1841–1842)
British expedition to Tibet (1903–1904)
Chinese expedition to Tibet (1910)
Annexation of Tibet by the People's Republic of China (1950)
Battle of Chamdo (1950)